Yali are a major tribal group in Highland Papua, Indonesia, and live to the east of the Baliem Valley in the Papuan highlands, mainly in Yalimo Regency, Yahukimo Regency, and the surrounding regencies. The Dani word for "lands of the east" is "yali", from where the Yali took it, without it being a self-identification for their tribe.

The settlement territory of the Yali lies between the rivers Ubahak to the East and Sibi, Yahuli and Podeng to the West. Their major towns are Anggruk and Kosarek, which are isolated by challenging geography. The major access to their territory is by air. The villages are only accessible by walking for several hours. Their territory is known collectively as Yalimo.  To the West live the Dani, to the Northwest, partially in the mountains, the Lani. To the East and South are the territories of the Eipo and Mek. Accounts of the population size vary according to the source. In 1991 it was estimated to be 15,000 or 30,000.

The Yali speak a language that is related to that of the Dani, although it has significant differences. The language is in the Ngalik-Nduga subfamily. Today the Yali are of Christian religion, mainly Protestant. Until the 1970s there were reports of cannibalism. The Christian missionaries stopped several feuds between villages; old war rituals and ancestor cult were forgotten. The Yali live in villages with round houses on poles, where houses for women and men separate the sexes. Water for drinking, domestic use and wastewater are strictly separated. The Yali are of rather small stature (partially smaller than 150 cm).

Traditionally the men are only clothed with a penis sheath (koteka) and rattan rings around the waist. Their heads are occasionally covered with hair nets, which have a pointed end at the neck. The women only wear a skirt made of reed. However, T-shirts and trousers or skirts and blouses are becoming more common. The Yali use sweet potatoes and taro as their staple foods, which are grown using shifting cultivation. Other food sources are hunting and gathering. For festivities such as weddings pigs are slaughtered, which are only being kept extensively. Fruits are not part of the common diet.

A patriarchal society, the men are responsible for building houses and hunting, while women take care growing and gathering food.

See also

Indigenous people of New Guinea

References

Ethnic groups in Indonesia
Indigenous ethnic groups in Western New Guinea